Roger Hugh Lawson, Jr. (born September 23, 1941) is a senior United States district judge of the United States District Court for the Middle District of Georgia.

Education and career

Born in Hawkinsville, Georgia, Lawson received a Bachelor of Arts degree from Emory University in 1963 and a Juris Doctor from Emory University School of Law in 1964. He was in private practice in Hawkinsville from 1965 to 1979. He was a judge of the Superior Court of Georgia, Oconee Judicial Circuit of Georgia from 1979 to 1995.

Federal judicial service

On August 10, 1995, Lawson was nominated by President Bill Clinton to a seat on the United States District Court for the Middle District of Georgia vacated by Wilbur D. Owens, Jr. Lawson was confirmed by the United States Senate on December 22, 1995, and received his commission on December 26, 1995. He served as chief judge from 2006 to 2008, assuming senior status on December 31, 2008.

Sources

References

1941 births
Living people
Emory University alumni
Emory University School of Law alumni
Georgia (U.S. state) state court judges
Judges of the United States District Court for the Middle District of Georgia
People from Hawkinsville, Georgia
Superior court judges in the United States
United States district court judges appointed by Bill Clinton
20th-century American judges
21st-century American judges